James Charles Dickinson (born May 23, 1999) is an American beauty YouTuber and makeup artist. While working as a local makeup artist in his hometown of Bethlehem, New York, Charles started a YouTube channel, where he posts makeup tutorials. In 2016, he became the first male brand ambassador for CoverGirl after a tweet featuring his makeup went viral online.

In 2020, Charles hosted, directed, and co-produced the YouTube Originals reality competition series Instant Influencer. He has released an eyeshadow palette and created a makeup line in collaboration with Morphe Cosmetics, and has received numerous awards for his work on social media, including two People's Choice Awards, three Streamy Awards, one Shorty Award, and one Teen Choice Award.

His career has included multiple online controversies, including a widely publicized feud with fellow beauty YouTuber Tati Westbrook in 2019. After being accused by several underage boys of online grooming, Charles admitted to sexting with two underage boys though denied knowing they were underage at the time.

Early life 
James Charles Dickinson was born on May 23, 1999 in Bethlehem, New York, to parents Skip, a contractor, and Christine Dickinson. His younger brother, Ian Jeffrey, works as a model. He attended Bethlehem Central High School, where he graduated in 2017. Describing his high school experience, he stated, "I did get bullied a lot in high school and personally, I just ignored it." Charles began working as an amateur hairstylist and started doing makeup after being asked by a friend to do her makeup for a school dance. After teaching himself how to apply makeup, he soon began doing it professionally for girls in his area.

Career 
In December 2015, Charles started a YouTube channel where he began posting makeup tutorials. A tweet of him retaking his senior portrait with a ring light and makeup on went viral in September 2016. In October 2016, when he was 17, he became the first male brand ambassador for cosmetics brand CoverGirl. The appointment was met with significant praise on social media. His first appearance was in advertisements for CoverGirl's So Lashy mascara. He started a clothing line, Sisters Apparel, and a makeup collection, the Sister Collection, made in collaboration with cosmetics brand Morphe Cosmetics, in November 2018.

By early 2019, he had 10 million subscribers on YouTube. His January 2019 visit to Birmingham for the opening of Morphe Cosmetics' second United Kingdom store caused gridlock in the city center. Charles did Australian rapper Iggy Azalea's makeup for promotional art for her single "Sally Walker" in March 2019 and appeared in the song's music video. He announced he would go on the Sisters Tour throughout the US in April 2019. However, the tour was canceled the following month following a highly publicized feud with American social media personality Tati Westbrook.

Charles hosted the first season of the YouTube Originals reality competition series Instant Influencer, which premiered on his YouTube channel in April 2020. For his work on the show, he won the award for Show of the Year at the 10th Streamy Awards. In March 2021, YouTube announced that he would not return to host the second season of the show. In October 2020, Charles made a cameo appearance in the music video for American social media personality Larray's single "Canceled".

Since the launch of his channel, Charles has made a number of collaborative videos, doing makeup on and with various public figures including: Kim Kardashian, Kylie Jenner, Lil Nas X, Kesha, Madison Beer, Doja Cat, JoJo Siwa, Charli D'Amelio, Addison Rae, Trixie Mattel, Avani Gregg, and Bretman Rock. 

In January 2021, Charles sang a cover of "Drivers License".

In May 2022, Charles posted a photo of him tucking himself, as well as a video of him twerking while tucked, after which he stated he lost over 80,000 followers. After noting the loss of followers, he stated, "I'm so sorry that y'all are boring, u will not be missed." The Tab noted the loss of followers eventually topped 130,000.

Public image 
Early in his career, Charles received attention for being a young male makeup artist. Todd Spangler of Variety called him "YouTube's most famous beauty vlogger". Writing for the Irish Independent, Caitlin McBride remarked that he "spearheaded a makeup revolution among men", while Amelia Tait of The Guardian wrote that his online platform was "arguably revolutionary". Teen Vogue referred to him in 2019 as "one of the most famous YouTube makeup artists and beauty influencers around", while Noelle Faulkner of Vogue Australia wrote in 2018 that he had "one of the most engaged followings on YouTube".

Charles refers to his fans as "sisters". He has cited Jaclyn Hill and Nikkie de Jager as his biggest influences. He has said that, for him, makeup is "a creative outlet and an art form". In May 2021, he was sued by a former employee of his for wrongful termination.

Tati Westbrook feud 
In 2019, Tati Westbrook, a fellow makeup artist and frequent collaborator with Charles, uploaded a 43-minute video titled Bye Sister, accusing him of disloyalty and attempting to seduce a heterosexual man. YouTuber Jeffree Star and singer Zara Larsson corroborated Westbrook's claims and Charles became the first YouTuber to lose one million subscribers in 24 hours. He uploaded an eight-minute apology video to Westbrook, which became one of the most disliked videos on YouTube before it was deleted. He posted a second 41-minute video titled No More Lies addressing and refuting the comments made by Westbrook, which led to renewed online support for Charles and criticism of Westbrook. Westbrook later removed the original video and, in 2020, posted a follow-up video in which she stated that Star and Shane Dawson manipulated her into making the original video. This series of events sparked media analysis relating to cancel culture, allegations of toxicity against YouTube's beauty community, stereotypes of gay men as predatory, and the profits made from online feuds.

Grooming allegations 
In February 2021, a 16-year-old boy named Isaiyah posted a video to TikTok alleging that Charles groomed him by sending him nude photos and pressuring him into sexting with him despite knowing his age. Charles responded to the video with a tweet denying the grooming accusations and stating that the boy initially claimed to be 18 years old. In March 2021, other underage boys accused Charles of sending unsolicited nude photos and pressuring them into sexting with him. In April 2021, Charles posted a 14-minute-long video titled Holding Myself Accountable, in which he stated that he sent sexually explicit messages to "two different people, both under the age of 18", though he denied knowing they were underage at the time. Charles called his past behavior "reckless" and "desperate", stating, "to the guys involved in the situation, I wanna say I'm sorry. I'm sorry that I flirted with you and I'm really sorry if I ever made you uncomfortable. It is completely unacceptable". Later that month, Morphe released a statement saying they would cut business ties with Charles and YouTube temporarily demonetized his channel. He returned to YouTube with a video titled An Open Conversation in July 2021.

Personal life
Charles came out as gay to his parents at age 12. Addressing questions about his gender identity, he stated, "I'm confident in myself and my gender identity – [I'm] happy being a boy. But at the same time, I love makeup. I have a full set of nails on all the time." As of 2019, his net worth was estimated to be US$12 million. In 2020, he purchased a US$7 million mansion in Los Angeles.

Filmography

Awards and nominations

References

External links
 
 
 

1999 births
American child models
American make-up artists
American TikTokers
American YouTubers
Beauty and makeup YouTubers
Fashion influencers
Fashion YouTubers
Gay entertainers
Gay models
American gay men
American LGBT entertainers
LGBT people from New York (state)
LGBT TikTokers
LGBT YouTubers
Living people
Male bloggers
Male models from New York (state)
People from Bethlehem, New York
Streamy Award winners
YouTube controversies
YouTube vloggers
21st-century American LGBT people